Antigo soils are among the most extensive soils in Wisconsin. They occur on about 300,000 acres (1,200 km²) in the northern part of the State. Antigo soils are well-drained and formed under northern hardwood forests in loess and loamy sediments over stratified sandy outwash. The soil series was named after the city of Antigo, Wisconsin.

They are very productive soils for corn, small grain, and hay. In some areas, potatoes or snap beans are important crops. The steeper areas are used for pasture or for timber production.
In 1983, with the lobbying of University of Wisconsin–Madison soil scientist Francis Hole, the Wisconsin Legislature designated Antigo silt loam as the official State soil of Wisconsin.

References

External links 

Pedology
Soil in the United States
Geology of Wisconsin
Symbols of Wisconsin
Types of soil